The National Assembly (Assemblée Nationale) was the parliament of Chad. It had 188 members, elected for a four-year term. It had 25 single-member constituencies and 34 multi-member constituencies. On 20 April 2021, after  Idriss Déby was killed, a coup occurred which dissolved the National Assembly and its functions were assumed by the Transitional Military Council, a junta led by Deby’s son.

Latest elections

See also
Politics of Chad
List of presidents of the National Assembly of Chad
List of legislatures by country

References

Politics of Chad
Government of Chad
Chad
Chad
1960 establishments in Chad